Fernand Seguin,  (June 9, 1922 – June 19, 1988) was a Canadian biochemist, professor and host of science programs on radio and television.

Honours
 In 1977, he was awarded the UNESCO Kalinga Prize for the Popularization of Science.
 In 1978, he was made an Officer of the Order of Canada and was promoted to Companion in 1988.
 In 1979, he received an honorary doctorate from Concordia University.
 In 1985, he was made an Officer of the National Order of Quebec.
 In 1988, he was awarded the Sandford Fleming medal by the Royal Canadian Institute.

References

External links
 Fernand Seguin at The Canadian Encyclopedia

1922 births
1988 deaths
Canadian biochemists
Companions of the Order of Canada
Officers of the National Order of Quebec
Scientists from Montreal
Sandford Fleming Award recipients
Kalinga Prize recipients
20th-century Canadian biologists